Haim Watzman (born 1956, Cleveland, Ohio), is an American-born, Jerusalem-based writer, journalist, and translator.

Watzman was born in Cleveland, Ohio and grew up in Silver Spring, Maryland. After receiving a B.A. from Duke University, Watzman made aliyah to Israel, where he has lived since 1978 and worked as a freelance translator and journalist. He lives in Jerusalem with his wife, Ilana, and four children.

Watzman is the author of Company C: An American’s Life as a Citizen-Soldier in Israel (Farrar, Straus & Giroux 2005), a memoir centered on his service in a reserve infantry unit in the Israel Defense Forces and A Crack in the Earth: A Journey Up Israel’s Rift Valley (Farrar, Straus & Giroux 2007), as well as Necessary Stories (West 26th Street Press 2017).

Watzman is known for his English translations of recent works by Hebrew-language authors. His translations include Tom Segev’s The Seventh Million, Elvis in Jerusalem, One Palestine Complete, and "A State at any Cost", as well as David Grossman’s The Yellow Wind, Sleeping on a Wire, and Death as a Way of Life.

He served for 25 years as Israel correspondent for The Chronicle of Higher Education, and was Israel correspondent for the British science journal Nature. His opinion pieces have appeared on the pages of The New York Times, Los Angeles Times, and The Forward.

Watzman currently writes the monthly “Necessary Stories” column for The Jerusalem Report, and co-authors the widely read South Jerusalem blog, along with Gershom Gorenberg. In 2017 a collection of his "Necessary Stories" was published.

Bibliography
 Company C: an American's Life as a Citizen-soldier in Israel. New York: Farrar, Straus & Giroux (2005) 
 A Crack in the Earth: a journey up Israel's Rift Valley. New York: Farrar, Straus & Giroux (2007) 
 Necessary Stories. West 26th Street Press (2017)

Books translated
 Tom Segev, A State at Any Cost. The Life of David Ben-Gurion, Farrar, Straus and Giroux, 2019
 Hillel Cohen, Year Zero of the Israel-Arab Conflict, Brandeis University Press, 2015
 Itamar Radai, Palestinians in Jerusalem and Jaffa, 1948. Routledge Studies in the Arab-Israeli Conflict, 2015
 Tuvia Friling, A Jewish Kapo in Auschwitz: History, Memory, and the Politics of Survival. The Schusterman Series in Israel Studies, Brandeis, 2014
 Ephraim Shoham-Steiner, On the Margins of a Minority: Leprosy, Madness, and Disability among the Jews of Medieval Europe. Wayne State University Press, 2014
 Shlomo Avineri, Herzl: Theodor Herzl and the Foundation of the Jewish State. Weidenfeld & Nicolson, 2013
 Anat Helman, Young Tel Aviv: A Tale of Two Cities. The Schusterman Series in Israel Studies, Brandeis, 2012
 Tamar El Or, Reserved Seats: Religion, Gender and Ethnicity in Contemporary Israel. Wayne State University Press, 2012
 Orit Rozin, The Rise of the Individual in 1950s Israel: A Challenge to Collectivism. The Schusterman Series in Israel Studies, Brandeis, 2011
 Boaz Neumann, Land and Desire in Early Zionism. The Schusterman Series in Israel Studies, Brandeis, 2011
 Gilad Margalit, Guilt, Suffering, and Memory: Germany Remembers its Dead of World War II. Indiana University Press, 2010
 Hillel Cohen, Good Arabs: The Israeli Security Agencies and the Israeli Arabs. University of California Press, 2010
 Menachem Klein, 'The Shift: Israel-Palestine from Border Struggle to Ethnic Conflict. Columbia University Press, 2010
 Yoram Bilu, The Saints’ Impresarios: Dreamers, Healers, and Holy Men in Israel’s Urban Periphery. Academic Studies Press, 2009
 Menachem Klein, A Possible Peace. Columbia University Press, 2007
 Hillel Cohen, Army of Shadows, Palestinian Collaboration with Zionism, 1917–1948. University of California Press, 2007
 Yaakov Lozowick, Hitler's Bureaucrats: The Nazi Security Police and the Banality of Evil. Continuum, 2003
 Menachem Klein, The Jerusalem Problem: The Struggle for Permanent Status. University of Florida Press, 2003
 David Grossman, Death as a Way of Life. Farrar Straus, 2003
 Igal Sarna, The Man Who Fell into a Puddle. Knopf, 2002
 Tom Segev, Elvis in Jerusalem. Metropolitan, 2002
 Tamar El-Or, Next Pesach: Literacy and Identity among Young Orthodox Jewish Women. Wayne State University Press, 2002
 Menachem Klein, Jerusalem: The Contested City. Hurst/NYU Press, 2001
 Tom Segev, One Palestine Complete. Metropolitan, 2000
 Oz Almog, The Sabra: A Portrait, California University Press. 2000
 Tamar El-Or, Educated and Ignorant: On Ultra-Orthodox Women and Their World. Lynne Reinner, 1993
 David Grossman, Sleeping on a Wire. Farrar Straus, 1993
 Tom Segev, The Seventh Million. Hill & Wang, 1993
 David Grossman, The Yellow Wind. Farrar Straus, 1988
 Yuval Noah Harari, Sapiens: A Brief History of Humankind'', 2015

Notes

External links

 Official website, includes links to his articles published in the mainstream and Jewish press
 South Jerusalem blog, co-authored with Gershom Gorenberg

1956 births
Living people
Duke University alumni
American political writers
American male non-fiction writers
Jewish American writers
Israeli political writers
Translators from Hebrew
Translators to English
Hebrew–English translators
Writers from Cleveland
American emigrants to Israel
People from Silver Spring, Maryland
Israeli soldiers